Kojátky is a municipality and village in Vyškov District in the South Moravian Region of the Czech Republic. It has about 400 inhabitants.

Administrative parts
The village of Šardičky is an administrative part of Kojátky.

References

External links

Villages in Vyškov District